Kydd may refer to:

Kydd (surname)
Kydd (novel), a 2001 novel by Julian Stockwin
Kydd (rapper), American hip hop artist

See also
Kidd (disambiguation)